Ramel Antwone Curry (born April 17, 1980) is an American professional basketball player who plays for Sagesse Club of the Lebanese Basketball League.

College career
After playing high school basketball, Curry played college basketball at Fresno City College and at NCAA Division II California State University, Bakersfield. Curry played two seasons with the Cal State Bakersfield Roadrunners from 2000 to 2002.

Professional career
Curry won the Israeli Cup with Hapoel Jerusalem in 2008. He won the Ukrainian League championship in 2010 with Azovmash, and in 2012 with Donetsk. After winning the Greek League championship with Panathinaikos in 2013, he re-signed with the club.

His next season was successful, as he won the Greek Cup, being named the MVP of the final, and the Greek League championship with Panathinaikos. In 2014, Panathinaikos released him.

For the 2014–15 season, Curry signed with the Pro A and EuroLeague team Limoges CSP. On March 10, 2015, he left Limoges and signed with Virtus Roma of the Italian LBA for the rest of the season.

Awards and accomplishments

College career
NABC NCAA Division II All-District First Team: (2002)
Daktronics West Region First Team: (2002)
California Collegiate Athletic Association Player of the Year: (2002)
NCAA Division II Third Team All American: (2002)

Pro career
Israeli Cup Winner: (2008)
2× Ukrainian League Champion: (2010, 2012)
2× Ukrainian League MVP: (2011, 2012)
VTB United League MVP: (2011)
 EuroCup Top Scorer: (2012)
All-EuroCup Second Team: (2012)
2× Greek League Champion: (2013, 2014)
Greek Cup Winner: (2014)
Greek Cup Final Top Scorer: (2014)
Greek Cup Final MVP: (2014)

References

External links
 Euroleague.net Profile
 FIBA Europe Profile
 Eurobasket.com Profile
 Draftexpress.com Profile
 Greek Basket League Profile
 TBLStat.net Profile
 Italian League Profile 
 DiamondSportsAgency Profile

1980 births
Living people
African-American basketball players
American expatriate basketball people in the Dominican Republic
American expatriate basketball people in France
American expatriate basketball people in Greece
American expatriate basketball people in Israel
American expatriate basketball people in Italy
American expatriate basketball people in Lebanon
American expatriate basketball people in Turkey
American expatriate basketball people in Ukraine
American expatriate basketball people in Venezuela
American men's basketball players
Austin Toros players
Basketball players from New York City
BC Azovmash players
BC Donetsk players
Cal State Bakersfield Roadrunners men's basketball players
Cocodrilos de Caracas players
Columbus Riverdragons players
Erdemirspor players
Hapoel Jerusalem B.C. players
Fresno City Rams men's basketball players
Limoges CSP players
Martin Van Buren High School alumni
Pallacanestro Virtus Roma players
Panathinaikos B.C. players
Point guards
S.S. Felice Scandone players
Shooting guards
Sportspeople from Brooklyn
Victoria Libertas Pallacanestro players
Sagesse SC basketball players
21st-century African-American sportspeople
20th-century African-American people